Rumyantsev was a family of Russian counts. Rumyantsev may also refer to
Rumyantsev (surname)
Rumyantsev Museum in Moscow
The Rumyantsev Case, a 1956 Soviet film
Operation Polkovodets Rumyantsev, a World War II military operation